Abul Basar Akand is a Bangladesh Nationalist Party politician and a Member of Parliament from Mymensingh-2.

Career
Akand was elected to parliament from Mymensingh-2 as an Bangladesh Nationalist Party candidate in February 1996.

References

Bangladesh Nationalist Party politicians
Year of birth missing (living people)
6th Jatiya Sangsad members